Clayton Earl Desmond (9 March 1894 – 14 July 1968) was a National Government and Progressive Conservative party member of the House of Commons of Canada. He was born in Morpeth, Ontario and became a farmer by career.

He was first elected to Parliament at the Kent riding in the 1940 general election under the National Government affiliation, then re-elected as a Progressive Conservative for a second term in 1945. He was defeated by Blake Huffman of the Liberal party in the 1949 election.

References

External links
 

1894 births
1968 deaths
Canadian farmers
Members of the House of Commons of Canada from Ontario
Progressive Conservative Party of Canada MPs